Richard Joseph Riordan (born May 1, 1930) is an American investment banker, businessman, lawyer, Korean War veteran, and former Republican politician. 

Riordan was the 39th Mayor of Los Angeles. Elected in 1993 and re-elected in 1997, he served until 2001, when he was term limited. He remains the last Republican Mayor of Los Angeles over twenty years later. He ran unsuccessfully for Governor in the 2002 California gubernatorial election, losing the Republican primary. After politics, he resumed his business career, specializing in private equity.

Early life, education, and career 
Riordan was born in Flushing, Queens, to an Irish-American family and raised in New Rochelle, New York. He graduated from Princeton University in 1952 with an A.B. in philosophy after completing a senior thesis titled "A Study of the Thomistic Faculty Psychology." He received a J.D. from The University of Michigan Law School in 1956. 

That year, he moved to Los Angeles, joining the downtown law firm of O'Melveny & Myers. In 1959, he left to become a partner of Nossaman LLP. In 1975, he was a founding partner of the law firm Riordan & McKinzie, which merged with Bingham McCutcheon in 2003. In 1982, he was a founder of the private equity firm Riordan, Lewis & Haden.

Mayor of Los Angeles 

When Tom Bradley announced he was retiring as Mayor of Los Angeles, Riordan set his sights on the 1993 election. Riordan won 54%–46%, becoming the first Republican mayor in over 36 years. As Mayor, the heavily Democratic City Council blocked many of his proposals, or they proved unfeasible in reality. For example, the police academy did not have enough classroom space or instructors to train as many new police officers as Riordan had initially promised. He streamlined certain business regulations and established "one-stop" centers around the city for services, like permit applications. 

Riordan feuded with police chief Daryl Gates' successor, former Philadelphia police commissioner Willie Williams, but oversaw a general decline in city crime. Ultimately, Riordan replaced Williams with LAPD veteran Bernard Parks in 1997, the year he was re-elected mayor over California State Senator Tom Hayden.

Riordan's tenure was marked by controversy over the  Los Angeles County Metropolitan Transportation Authority's Red Line subway’s construction cost overruns. Because the overruns resulted in MTA funds being reallocated from bus funding, the Bus Riders Union sued the city, alleging racial discrimination, resulting in a 1996 consent decree that eviscerated MTA funding for subway and light rail construction projects. Riordan publicly stated that he regretted signing the consent decree and it was his biggest mistake as mayor.

Before becoming mayor, Riordan spearheaded the city's successful term limit ballot initiative and he was therefore term-limited from office in 2001. Riordan endorsed his adviser and friend, Steve Soboroff, to succeed him. Soboroff, however, came in third in the non-partisan mayoral primary election. Former California State Assembly Speaker Antonio Villaraigosa advanced to the runoff against James Hahn. Riordan endorsed Villaraigosa in the second round, but Hahn won and succeeded him as mayor. Four years later, Villaraigosa defeated Hahn in the 2005 rematch and became Mayor.

2002 California gubernatorial race 
In 2002, Riordan decided to seek the governorship. In the Republican primary election, he faced  conservative businessman Bill Simon and former California Secretary of State Bill Jones. Although Riordan had a 30-point lead early in the race, Simon beat him by 18 points. Riordan’s loss mainly can be attributed a conservative Republican party base that rejected his moderate Republicanism and efforts to move the party to the political center. Incumbent Democratic Governor Gray Davis felt he had a much better chance to beat Simon, so he spent millions of dollars running attack ads against Riordan in the Republican primary. Davis’s cross-party strategy was successful. Riordan lost the primary, and Davis defeated Simon 47%–42% in the general election.

The Los Angeles Examiner
In early 2003, Riordan circulated a prototype of a locally-focused, sophisticated, and politically-independent weekly newspaper, The Los Angeles Examiner, he hoped to start publishing in June. It was, however, never published. Riordan put the project on hold when Governor Arnold Schwarzenegger, who defeated Grey Davis in the October 2003 recall election, appointed him Secretary of Education. He served in the position from 2003 until he resigned in 2005.

Involvement in city politics since 2001 
Since being mayor, Riordan has been involved in Los Angeles politics. In the 2001 Los Angeles mayoral election, Riordan endorsed his friend and adviser Steve Soboroff in the primary and Antonio Villaraigosa in the general election. In 2005, he backed former State Assembly Speaker Robert Hertzberg in the primary and Antonio Villaraigosa in the general election. In both races, he chose not to endorse James Hahn.

Riordan has played a role in City Council elections, supporting Bill Rosendahl, who won election in the Eleventh District in 2005; Monica Rodriguez, who lost to Seventh District Councilman Richard Alarcon in 2007; and Adeena Bleich, who lost to Paul Koretz and David Vahedi, who advanced to the runoff election. In 2013, Riordan endorsed Wendy Greuel for mayor. She ultimately was defeated by then-Council member Eric Garcetti.

Personal life and legacy
The Richard J. Riordan Central Library in Los Angeles is named after him. Riordan owns the Original Pantry Cafe, which has operated in Los Angeles since 1924, and Gladstones Malibu, which has been open since 1972.

References

Sources
 "Still at sea: PLC Global Counsel law firm review 2003" Practical Law UK Signon, 18 November 2003.
 Taub, Daniel. "Riordan made his fortune backing start-up ventures," Los Angeles Business Journal, June 30, 1997
 Wood, Daniel B. "Riordan: 'Goofy' or a Mr. Fixit?," Christian Science Monitor, August 5, 2003
 Zwiebach, Elloitt "The LBO maker (leveraged buyouts, Riordan Freeman & Spogli merchant bank)", Supermarket News, July 1987
 Ard, Scott "I know you are, but what am I?," CNET News, July 9, 2004
 Murphy, Jarrett "Furor Over 'Stupid Dirty Girl'," CBS News, July 9, 2004
 "Biography of Richard J. Riordan 39th Mayor of Los Angeles (1993-2001)"  Los Angeles Almanac. © 1998-2019 Given Place Media, publishing as Los Angeles Almanac.  2 Jan. 2019   
External links:  https://www.laalmanac.com/government/gl12_riordan.php

 

1930 births
Living people
20th-century American businesspeople
20th-century American lawyers
20th-century American politicians
21st-century American businesspeople
American military personnel of the Korean War
American people of Irish descent
American venture capitalists
Businesspeople from Queens, New York
California Republicans
Candidates in the 2002 United States elections
Mayors of Los Angeles
Military personnel from New Rochelle, New York
People associated with O'Melveny & Myers
People from Flushing, Queens
Politicians from New Rochelle, New York
Princeton University alumni
State cabinet secretaries of California
University of Michigan Law School alumni